The British International School of Stavanger is an international school in Stavanger, Norway. It was founded in 1977. The school currently caters to approximately 500 pupils from over 50 different nationalities, from 18 months of age up to the age of 19. The school offers the IB Primary Years Programme, the IB Middle Years Programme, the IB Diploma Programme and the IB Careers Programme.

References

External links 

 Home - British International School of Stavanger | Official website 

International schools in Norway
International Baccalaureate schools in Norway
Stavanger
Stavanger
Educational institutions established in 1977
1977 establishments in Norway